The BBC Sports Personality of the Year 2019 took place on 15 December 2019 at the P&J Live in Aberdeen.	

The event was broadcast live on BBC One, and hosted by Gary Lineker, Clare Balding and Gabby Logan. Lewis Capaldi performed "Hold Me While You Wait" and "Someone You Loved" during the memorial to those sportspeople who died in the past year and Emeli Sandé performed "Shine" to commemorate the 2019 FIFA Women's World Cup in France.

Nominees
The nominees for the award were revealed on 25 November 2019.	On the night of the final, the public were allowed to vote for one of only six contenders pre-selected by "an expert independent panel".

The winner of this award was Ben Stokes with Lewis Hamilton in second and Dina Asher-Smith in third.

Other awards
In addition to the main award as "Sports Personality of the Year", several other awards were also presented:

Overseas Personality: Eliud Kipchoge
Team of the Year: England cricket team
Lifetime Achievement: Tanni Grey-Thompson
Coach of the Year: John Blackie
Young Personality: Caroline Dubois
Unsung Hero Award: Keiren Thompson

In Memoriam

Gordon Banks
Billy McNeill Stevie Chalmers
Peter Snell Harrison Dillard Ken Matthews
Gordon Brand Jnr Brian Barnes
Jose Antonio Reyes Justin Edinburgh Fernando Ricksen
Alfie Linehan Abdul Qadir Malcolm Nash
Craig Fallon Iona Sclater Con de Lange
John McCririck Ferdy Murphy
Pernell Whitaker Saeideh Aletaha Patrick Day
Emiliano Sala David Ibbotson
Jordan Dawes Jerry Thompson Kat Lindner
Micky Steele-Bodger Garfield Owen Austin Rhodes
Chester Williams
Niki Lauda
Anthoine Hubert Charlie Whiting
Tommy Smith Brian Mawhinney Peter Thompson
Olly Croft Mike Watterson Paul Hutchins
Jake Burton Carpenter Stuart Fitzsimmons Matti Nykanen
Jean Stone Peter Carruthers Marieke Vervoort
Ron Saunders Bill Slater Jim Smith
Archie Bruce Peter Fox Natalie Harrowell
Vikki Orvice Hugh McIlvanney Dianne Oxberry
Bob Willis

References

External links
Official website

BBC Sports Personality of the Year awards
BBC Sports Personality of the Year Award
Bbc
BBC Sports Personality of the Year Award
BBC Sports Personality of the Year Award
Bbc